Charles M. Murphy is an American Roman Catholic priest of the Diocese of Portland, Maine. Monsignor Murphy formerly served as the academic dean and rector of the Pontifical North American College in Rome from 1979 to 1984.

Murphy earned a doctorate in sacred theology from the Pontifical Gregorian University and a master's degree in education from Harvard University. He graduated with a bachelor's degree in classics from the College of the Holy Cross in 1957.

Publications
Belonging to God: A Personal Training

References

Living people
Roman Catholic Diocese of Portland
College of the Holy Cross alumni
Pontifical Gregorian University alumni
Harvard Graduate School of Education alumni
Pontifical North American College alumni
Pontifical North American College rectors
Clergy from Portland, Maine
Year of birth missing (living people)
20th-century American Roman Catholic priests
21st-century American Roman Catholic priests